Tose may refer to:

Leonard Tose (1915–2003), businessman
Toše Proeski (1981–2007), Macedonian singer
Tose (company), Japanese video game developer
An alternate name for Thorsø, Norway